Brahima Traoré (born 24 February 1974) is a Burkinabé footballer and manager.

Player career
The midfielder played for ASFA Yennenga, FC Bressuire and Al Dhaid FC.

International career
Traoré has played for the Burkina Faso national football team at the 1996, 1998 and 2000 African Cup of Nations.

Coach career
In 2012, he worked as assistant manager for Al Dhaid FC.

References

1974 births
Living people
Burkinabé footballers
Burkinabé expatriate footballers
Burkina Faso international footballers
Burkinabé football managers
ASFA Yennenga players
Al Dhaid SC players
UAE First Division League players
1996 African Cup of Nations players
1998 African Cup of Nations players
2000 African Cup of Nations players
Association football midfielders
Expatriate footballers in the United Arab Emirates
21st-century Burkinabé people